Locustopsis reducta is an extinct species of grasshopper in the family Locustopsidae, with fossils found in Germany.

References

Caelifera
Insects described in 1939